Newburgh is a civil parish in the West Lancashire district of Lancashire, England.  It contains 37 buildings that are recorded in the National Heritage List for England as designated listed buildings.  Of these, one is at Grade II*, the middle grade, and the others are at Grade II, the lowest grade.  The parish contains the village of Newburgh and surrounding countryside.  Most of the listed buildings are houses, farmhouses and farm buildings.  The Leeds and Liverpool Canal and the River Douglas run through the parish, and associated with these are aqueducts and a culvert.  The other listed buildings include a village cross, a public house, a post office, a war memorial, and a telephone kiosk.


Key

Buildings

References

Citations

Sources

Lists of listed buildings in Lancashire
Buildings and structures in the Borough of West Lancashire